Valley of Song is a 1953 British comedy drama film directed by Gilbert Gunn and starring Mervyn Johns, Clifford Evans, Maureen Swanson and the London Welsh Association Choral Society. It marked the film debut of actress Rachel Roberts. It was released in the U.S. as Men Are Children Twice.

Premise
Fierce rivalries flare to the surface in a small Welsh town over a coveted role in the local choir.

Cast
 Mervyn Johns as Minister Griffiths
 Clifford Evans as Geraint Llewellyn
 Maureen Swanson as Olwen Davies
 John Fraser as Cliff Lloyd
 Rachel Thomas as Mrs. Lloyd
 Betty Cooper as Mrs. Davies
 Rachel Roberts as Bessie Lewis
 Hugh Pryse as Lloyd, Undertaker
 Edward Evans as Davies
 Kenneth Williams as Lloyd the Haulage
 Alun Owen as Pritchard
 Ronald Lewis as  Uncredited role
 Desmond Llewelyn as Lloyd the Schoolmaster

Production
Filmed on location in Carmarthenshire in 1952, as well as at Elstree Studios, Valley of Song marks the first film appearance of Rachel Roberts and the first film credit of Kenneth Williams, both of whom worked together in Swansea repertory theatre in 1950 under the directorship of Clifford Evans, who also stars in the film.

Release
After the initial trade screening to cinema bookers on 26 February 1953, Valley of Song had four simultaneous World premieres in Wales, opening at cinemas in Cardiff, Newport, Merthyr Tydfil, and Swansea, all on 13 April 1953.

Critical reception
Eye for Film noted "an enjoyable if somewhat low-key story which, at 72 minutes in length, would make for a suitably harmonious Sunday afternoon. From the whistle of the steam trains, to the film’s score, provided courtesy of the London Welsh Association Choral Society, Valley Of Song is a pleasing if utterly unchallenging delight."

References

External links

1953 films
1953 comedy-drama films
British comedy-drama films
Films shot at Associated British Studios
Films set in Wales
Films directed by Gilbert Gunn
British black-and-white films
1950s English-language films
1950s British films